The Gracious Few is the sole studio album by rock supergroup The Gracious Few.

History
Drummer Chad Gracey explained the album's sound, "We knew we wanted to be a little harder than what Live had been doing and even what Candlebox had been doing. Chad Taylor comes up with a lot of the riffs that we start the songs from and he was just playing this real sort of heavy, bluesy stuff. Once we heard that we were like, 'Wow, this is kind of a Led Zeppelin, throwback feel' and it just sort of happened. We didn't consciously decide...those were just the songs that started flowing."

The first single released was "Honest Man". Singer Kevin Martin said of the song, "It reminds me of my father. He was a World War II veteran. He believed in the American dream with all his heart, he was the honest man of his generation. Now I turn on the television and see Americans without jobs, without food and without a chance to help themselves. This song is a wake up call to the forces of the world who would dare to stand in the way of our ability to provide for ourselves."

Track listing

Band
 Kevin Martin: lead vocals
 Sean Hennesy: lead guitar, backing vocals
 Chad Taylor: rhythm guitar, backing vocals
 Patrick Dahlheimer: bass 
 Chad Gracey: drums

Album credits

Jerry Harrison - producer
Tom Lord-Alge - mixing
Lawrence Goldfarb - executive producer
Ted Jensen - mastering
Karl Derfler - engineer, mixing
Matt Cohen - engineer

Matt Wilenchick - second engineer
Femio Hernandez - mixing assistant
Matt Gracey - technician
Carson Slovak - art direction, design
Brad Kenyon - photography
Jesse Brown - logo

Reception

Allmusic gave the album 3.5 stars out of 5, in a generally positive review. They hinted at the difficulty in creating a 'classic rock' album without sounding 'dated' by saying that the band, "Have crafted a note of fondness (not quite a love letter) to '70s hard rock that has enough post-grunge radio polish on it to keep things in perspective." A glowing review from Type 3 Media said the album contained, "An impressive collection of heavy brooding groove-laden tunes" and praised the band for, "Exploring sounds and styles they may not have been able to lay down in a studio previously."

Alternative Addiction said that, "When you throw in Live, Candlebox, classic rock and Jerry Harrison doing some decent production you get a great album by The Gracious Few." In a generally favourable review they expressed a preference for the album's heavier songs, claiming that, "The band is at its best on the edgier songs where Martin is belting out vocals, when they’re not taking advantage of that some boredom can set in."

Chart performance

References

2010 debut albums
Albums produced by Jerry Harrison
The Gracious Few albums